The mass-spring-damper model consists of discrete mass nodes distributed throughout an object and interconnected via a network of springs and dampers. This model is well-suited for modelling object with complex material properties such as nonlinearity and viscoelasticity.
Packages such as MATLAB may be used to run simulations of such models. As well as engineering simulation, these systems have applications in computer graphics and computer animation.

Derivation (Single Mass) 
Deriving the equations of motion for this model is usually done by examining the sum of forces on the mass: 

By rearranging this equation, we can derive the standard form: 

 where 

The homogeneous equation for the mass spring system is:

This has the solution:

If  then  is negative, meaning the square root will be negative the solution will have an oscillatory component.

See also
 Numerical methods
 Soft body dynamics#Spring/mass models
 Finite element analysis

References

Classical mechanics
Mechanical vibrations